Miguel Ángel Sanchez (September 8, 1936 – March 26, 2008) was an Argentine football goalkeeper who played for a number of clubs in the Argentine Primera and Cúcuta Deportivo of Colombia.

Nicknamed Teté, he played 68 games as goalkeeper for Quilmes from 1955 to 1958 and also from 1967 to 1969. For Lanús he participated in 22 games from 1959 to 1960 and for Atlanta played in 83 games.
For Cúcuta Deportivo of Colombia he played more than 20 games during 1970.

External links
  Sentimiento Latino link
 Lanus Soccer team history page
 Miguel Todaro tribute blog

1936 births
2008 deaths
People from Quilmes
Argentine footballers
Argentine Primera División players
Categoría Primera A players
Argentine expatriate footballers
Expatriate footballers in Colombia
Quilmes Atlético Club footballers
Club Atlético Lanús footballers
Club Atlético Atlanta footballers
Argentine television personalities
Association football goalkeepers
Sportspeople from Buenos Aires Province